Angelitos negros (English: "Little Black Angels") is a 1948 Mexican drama film directed and co-written by Joselito Rodriguez and starring Pedro Infante.

Plot 
Jose Carlos Ruiz (Pedro Infante) is a famous singer that meets Ana Luisa de la Fuente (Emilia Guiú) an assistant manager of a girls school. José Carlos begins to fall in love with her and they become engaged. Then Jose Carlos begins to realize that his future wife is prejudiced against black people, because she does not accept that he performs alongside mulatto artists.

Ana Luisa herself has a nanny called Merce (Rita Montaner) that has cared for her all her life and is a woman of color, she is accustomed to her but openly dislikes her. José Carlos tries his best to resolve the conflicts that his wife's racist attitude brings to their family. Ana Luisa soon gives birth to a daughter who surprisingly turns out to be dark-skinned, horrifying Ana Luisa. They name her Belen (Titina Romay).

Belen suffers a lot because her mother does not love her because of her color. Because of that Belen gets paint on one occasion and paints her face white trying to be accepted by her mom. Ana Luisa blames Jose Carlos' family for having African ancestry. But José Carlos knows the truth. Father Francisco (Nicolás Rodríguez) revealed to him that Ana Luisa's real mother is the nanny Merce who in her youth had an affair with her boss, Mr. de la Fuente. In order for her daughter to receive the benefits of inheriting a rich position, Merce renounced her motherhood to be close to her daughter, and took a role as a servant in the household. 

Nana Merce falls ill and Jose Carlos tries to bring Isabel (Chela Castro), a fellow artist to take care of Belen because her mother does not give her any attention. Then tragedy occurs because Ana Luisa comes to believe that her husband wants to stick his lover in their home and she reacts violently throwing nanny Merce down the stairs by accident. On her deathbed, Merce tells Ana Luisa the truth about her parentage. After this shocking revelation, Ana Luisa accepts her heritage and cries for her mother after she dies. She also decides to start loving her daughter and gives her a hug.

Cast 
 Pedro Infante as José Carlos Ruiz
 Emilia Guiú as Ana Luisa de la Fuente
 Rita Montaner as Mercé
 Titina Romay as Belén
 Chela Castro as Isabel
 Nicolás Rodríguez as Padre Francisco
 Antonio R. Frausto as Laureano
 María Douglas as Malú del Rey
 Juan Pulido as Ildefonso Sánchez
 Chimi Monterrey as Fernando Valdés
 Ramiro Gamboa

Music
Pedro Infante sings the title song Angelitos Negros. Andrés Eloy Blanco's poem Píntame Angelitos Negros was set to music by the Mexican composer Manuel Álvarez Maciste. It's a protest against racism.

The instrumental music was written by Nacho García and Raúl Lavista.

See also
 El alma no tiene color, a 1997 telenovela with a similar premise
 Angelitos negros (1970), a remake of this movie also directed by Joselito Rodriguez.
 Tornatrás, a casta for an individual born to a white and "albino" parent

References

Bibliography
 Juanita Heredia. Transnational Latina Narratives in the Twenty-first Century. Palgrave Macmillan, 2009.

External links 

Angelitos negros at Variety Distribution

Mexican drama films
Mexican black-and-white films
1948 drama films
1948 films
Films about interracial romance
Films about race and ethnicity
Films about racism
Films directed by Joselito Rodríguez
1940s Spanish-language films
1940s Mexican films